Chondrorrhina specularis is a species of scarab beetle.

Description
These medium-sized beetles have a black pronotum with brownish red edges. Elytra are black, with broad, brownish yellow stripes on each side.

Distribution
This species is widespread in  Kenya and Tanzania.

References

Cetoniinae
Beetles described in 1867